Lincoln Park School may refer to:

 Lincoln Park School (Greenfield, Indiana)
 Lincoln Park School (Pinebluff, North Carolina)